is a Japanese comedy manga series by Ken Wakai. It has been serialized via Futabasha's digital publication Web Comic Action since 2013 and has been collected in nine tankōbon volumes. It is a "silent" manga with no dialogue. The manga is published digitally in North America by Crunchyroll. An anime television series adaptation by Seven aired from April 6 to June 22, 2019.

Characters

Momoko is basically the leader in the trio of girls. She is voluptuous, carefree and adventurous, but sometimes she can also be a klutz; she would often be the one who gets upskirted without even her being aware of it. Her name in Japanese order is a play on words that can be translated to "girl with thick thighs".

Shibumi is the only one who wears glasses and sports a zettai ryoki; she is also a top student in her class. She is basically uptight and reserved in class, but when she is with her friends Momoko and Mayumi, she can let her hair down.

Mayumi is a transfer student, which explains why her uniform is different from her classmates. She is friends with Momoko and Shibumi. Among the trio, she is the petite one, but she is also very caring—-she would tell her friends if something is wrong.

Media

Manga

Anime
An anime television series adaptation was announced on the eighth volume of the manga on September 12, 2018. The series is animated by Seven, with Tokihiro Sasaki directed and writing the series, and Kyōhei Yamamoto designed the characters. The series aired from April 6 to June 22, 2019, on AT-X and Tokyo MX's FutabAnime time slot. Amatsuuni performed the series' opening theme song "silent days". Crunchyroll streamed the series.

Notes

References

External links
 
  
  

2019 anime television series debuts
Anime series based on manga
Comedy anime and manga
Futabasha manga
Japanese webcomics
Pantomime comics
Seinen manga
Seven (animation studio)
Webcomics in print